The Slovak Soviet Republic (literally: 'Slovak Republic of Councils') was a short-lived Communist state in southeast Slovakia in existence from 16 June 1919 to 7 July 1919. Its capital city was Prešov, and it was established and headed by Czech journalist Antonín Janoušek. It was the fourth communist state created in history.

In 1918, Czechoslovak troops began occupying northern Hungary in accordance with the territorial promises that the Triple Entente made to Czechoslovak politicians during World War I. However, Upper Hungary (today mostly Slovakia) was occupied by Hungarian troops from the Hungarian Soviet Republic, who helped create the Slovak Soviet Republic.

Following a brief war among Hungary, Czechoslovakia and Romania, the Slovak Soviet Republic fell and later the territory was incorporated into Czechoslovakia. A similar sounding state called the Slovak Socialist Republic existed during the existence of Czechoslovakia, between 1969 and 1990, succeeded by the Slovak Republic until 1992 and on 1 January 1993, Czechoslovakia collapsed into the Czech Republic and Slovakia.

See also

Hungarian Soviet Republic (Council Republic of Hungary)
Ukrainian Soviet Socialist Republic
German Revolution of 1918–1919
Spartacist uprising

References

Further reading
Toma, Peter A. "The Slovak Soviet Republic of 1919" American Slavic & East European Review (1958) 17#2 pp 203–215.

Communism in Slovakia
States and territories disestablished in 1919
States and territories established in 1919
Early Soviet republics
1919 in Slovakia
Former socialist republics
Former countries of the interwar period